Eibenstock is a town in the western Ore Mountains, in the Erzgebirgskreis, Saxony, Germany. It is situated near the river Mulde.

Geography 
Eibenstock has the following constituent communities: Eibenstock, Blauenthal, Wolfsgrün, Neidhardtsthal, Wildenthal, Oberwildenthal, Carlsfeld, Blechhammer, Neues Wiesenhaus, Sosa, Stabhammer, Wilzschmühle and Weitersglashütte.

History

Middle Ages
Owing to its elevation of more than 600 m, Eibenstock would not have been one of the first farming villages in the Ore Mountains, but rather a longstanding settlement in the form of a radial forest homestead village, founded at the earliest sometime in the thirteenth century in what later became the Barony of Schwarzenberg. About 1.5 km from the edge of town, not far from where the Steinbächel empties into the Große Bockau, a ringwall was unearthed.

The first two documentary mentions as Ybenstok and Ibenstok both date from the year 1378. At that time, an Alte Seife (“Old Placer”) was named, hinting that the village's development was also spurred by mining. Placer mines were being worked in the Eibenstock area even as late as the 19th century, although at the same time, iron ore and tin were also being mined from harder deposits. In 1560 Eibenstock became the official seat of a Bergamt ("mining office") and thereafter called itself freie Bergstadt ("free mining town").

In 1453, Elector Friedrich of Saxony fiefed the Brothers Leonhart und Nickel von Tannenberg auf Plohn with, among other things, the villages of Eibenstock, Sosa and Burkhardtsgrün. These were not under the new ownership for very long, as Wilhelm von Tannenberg had to give up Eibenstock by 1456 to the Hereditary Marshal of Saxony, Hans Löser. In 1464, Eibenstock passed to the lordly estate of Schwarzenberg and hence to the Saxon Amt of Schwarzenberg in 1533.

In 1532, the community was described as a market town, and in 1555 as a small town. The town was only granted market rights in 1639. In 1734, for the first time, a fish market was held at which fresh fish brought in from Hamburg was sold.

19th Century to Present
Clara Angermann brought Tambourieren to the town in 1775, a kind of artistic lace embroidery. She taught this to the women until 1780, and thereafter embroidery began to blossom. By 1850 there were 6 successful embroidering businesses and in 1858, the first embroidery machine went into operation. The work was famous worldwide, so much so that from 1891 to 1908, the United States even maintained a consulate in town to foster their business relationships.

After three great fires (1856, 1862 and 1892), to which whole neighbourhoods fell victim, reconstruction was undertaken in such a way as to give the buildings a more contemporary look. Between 1864 and 1868, the neo-Romanesque church was built, and in 1906 and 1907 a new art nouveau town hall.

With the First World War (1914–1918), the embroidery industry collapsed and could only establish itself once again after the Second World War. However, it never again achieved the level of fame that it had enjoyed before 1914.

From 1952 to 1990, Eibenstock was part of the Bezirk Karl-Marx-Stadt of East Germany. Small embroidery businesses merged into collectives such as the Produktionsgenossenschaften des Handwerks (PGH) Sticktex or the Eibenstocker Buntstickerei, but then in 1972, these were converted into a Volkseigener Betrieb (“nationally owned business”, a kind of enterprise found in the former East Germany)

Between 1974 and 1979 the second biggest dam project in East Germany was realized. A basin with 77 million cubic metres of storage and 350 ha in area was created and now supplies roughly a million people with drinking water.

After the political and economic changes of 1989 and 1990, Eibenstock's economy suffered, like that of much of the former East Germany, which had its ramifications for the administration of small communities. It became impossible to run them independently, and for this reason came on 1 January 1994 the amalgamation of Blauenthal, Neidhardtsthal, Wolfsgrün, Wildenthal and Oberwildenthal with Eibenstock, and likewise on 1 April 1997 of Carlsfeld and Weitersglashütte.

In 2005 Eibenstock celebrated 850 years of existence.

Population development
 1875 = 6,553 
 1913 = 9,899
 1959 = 9,500 
 1998 = 7,410
 2004 = 6,708
 2007 = 6,339
 2010 = 8,168
 2012 = 7,838
 2013 = 7,736

 Source as of 1998: Statistisches Landesamt des Freistaates Sachsen

Local council

The elections in May 2014 showed the following results:

 CDU: 11 Seats
 SPD: 4 Seats
 The Left: 1 Seat
 Gewerbeverein (Trade association): 1 Seat
 FWG (Free voters): 1 Seat

Culture and sightseeing 

 Neo-Romanesque church
 Replica of an Electorate of Saxony postal milestone at the Postplatz
 Restored Kingdom of Saxony station stone near the former postal station
 Eibenstock was once well known for its great Freier Deutscher Gewerkschaftsbund (FDGB) holiday home at the Eibenstock Reservoir. Today, the complex has been restored and is run as a hotel, beside which a waterpark has been built. Owing to the hotel's conspicuous blue paintwork, it has borne, since the restoration, the name Das Blaue Wunder (“The Blue Wonder”). The building was originally meant as lodging for the dam builders.
South of town is the 778-m-high Adlerfels (a crag), from near which, on a clear day, there is a wonderful panoramic view of Eibenstock. On the mountain ridge are found an all-weather bobsleigh run and a skilift.

Economy and infrastructure 
From the 14th to 18th centuries there was tin and iron ore mining in the region. After a great famine in 1771-1773, this industry was largely displaced by the embroidery industry.

Famous people

Honorary citizens 
 1895: Otto von Bismarck, Imperial Chancellor

Sons and daughters of the town 
 Friedrich August Unger (1833–1893), physician and co-founder of the health resort of Davos
 Hilmar Mückenberger (1855–1937), folk musician and dialect poet
 Paul Drews (1858-1912), theologian and university lecturer
 Werner Ehrig (1897-1981), an officer, most recently a general lieutenant in the Second World War
 Stephan Dietrich called Saafenlob (1898–1969), teacher and Ore Mountain (Erzgebirge) Heimatdichter (“homeland poet”)
 Bernd Leistner (1939- ), literature scientist and writer
 Ernst Einsiedel (1941- ), footballer
 Wolfgang Unger (1948–2004), choral conductor and academic in Leipzig

Personalities associated with Eibenstock 

 Jacob Seeling (1568-1627), hammer works owner in Blauen and Wildenthal
 Friedrich Wilhelm Köhler (1740-1798), pastor and chronicler
 Emil Cuno (1805-1859), lawyer and politician

References

External links 
 Eibenstock’s website

Erzgebirgskreis
Geological type localities